The  Washington Redskins season was the franchise's 61st season in the National Football League. This season began with the team trying to win their second Super Bowl in a row, following Super Bowl XXVI. 

The Redskins finished with a record of nine wins and seven losses, but still made the 1992–93 NFL playoffs. However, their hopes of back to back championships ended with a loss to the 49ers in the Divisional Round. The Redskins did not qualify for the postseason again until the 1999 season.

This season would be Joe Gibbs' final season coaching the Washington Redskins until he returned in the 2004 season. Gibbs is the most successful coach in Braves/Redskins/Football Team/Commanders history, leading the team to three Super Bowl victories (1982, 1987, 1991), and eight playoff berths in eleven seasons (1981-1992).

Draft Selections

The Redskins traded up in the first round to draft Desmond Howard, who would go on to play the most games for the Redskins of the draft class, despite only playing in 48 games for the team. He later won Super Bowl MVP as a member of the Green Bay Packers. Howard went on to have the longest career of the draft class playing 11 seasons, while the remainder of the draft class was out of league by the end of the 1997 season, all but one (Matt Elliott) of which was out by the end of the 1994 season. In 2015, the entire 1992 NFL Draft was named the worst draft class from 1990–2015 by NFL.com.

Roster

Schedule

Pre-season

Regular season

Note: Intra-division opponents are in bold text.

Playoffs

Standings

References

Washington
Washington Redskins seasons
Red